Empress Thừa Thiên (1762–1814), born Tống Phúc Thị Lan, was the first wife of Nguyễn Phúc Ánh (future Emperor Gia Long) and mother of Crown Prince Nguyễn Phúc Cảnh.

She was a daughter of general Tống Phước Khuông of the Nguyễn lords. Nguyễn Ánh married her when he was 18. Empress Thừa Thiên had two sons with Gia Long: Nguyen Phuc Chieu (who died after several days) and Crown Prince Nguyễn Phúc Cảnh. After her death, she was buried at Gia Long's Thiên Thọ tomb, alongside the Emperor.

References

1762 births
1814 deaths
People from Huế
Nguyễn dynasty empresses
19th-century Vietnamese women
18th-century Vietnamese women